Mohammad Ullah is a Jatiya Party (Ershad) politician and the former Member of Parliament of Laxmipur-3.

Career
Ullah was elected to parliament from Laxmipur-3 as a Jatiya Party candidate in 1986.

References

Jatiya Party politicians
Living people
3rd Jatiya Sangsad members
Year of birth missing (living people)